Steyermarkina is a genus of South American  plants in the tribe Eupatorieae within the family Asteraceae.

The genus name of Steyermarkina is in honour of Julian Alfred Steyermark (1909–1988), an American botanist. 

 Species
 Steyermarkina dispalata (Gardner) R.M.King & H.Rob. - Paraná, Minas Gerais, São Paulo, Rio de Janeiro
 Steyermarkina dusenii (Malme) R.M.King & H.Rob. - Paraná, Santa Catarina
 Steyermarkina pyrifolia (DC.) R.M.King & H.Rob. - Bahia, Espirito Santo, Paraná, Santa Catarina, Minas Gerais, São Paulo, Rio de Janeiro
 Steyermarkina triflora R.M.King & H.Rob. - State of Trujillo in western Venezuela
 formerly included
see Critonia 
 Steyermarkina naiguatensis - Critonia naiguatensis

References

Eupatorieae
Asteraceae genera
Flora of South America
Plants described in 1971